Baker Lake Airport  is located  southwest of Baker Lake, Nunavut, Canada. It is operated by the government of Nunavut.It has a single gravel runway .

Airlines and destinations

Ookpik Aviation operates charter flights.

See also
Baker Lake Water Aerodrome

References

External links

Certified airports in the Kivalliq Region